The 2002–03 Latvian Hockey League season was the 12th season of the Latvian Hockey League, the top level of ice hockey in Latvia. Six teams participated in the league, and HK Liepājas Metalurgs won the championship.

Regular season

Playoffs

Quarterfinals
 SK Ozollapas - ASK/Zemgale 5:3/2:16
 Stalkers Daugavpils - HK Vilki Riga 1:3/2:3

Semifinals
 HK Vilki Riga - HK Riga 2000 1:1/1:4
 ASK/Zemgale - HK Liepājas Metalurgs 1:10/1:6

3rd place
 HK Vilki Riga - ASK/Zemgale 6:4/3:3

Final 
 HK Liepājas Metalurgs - HK Riga 2000 4:3/3:3

External links
 Season hockeyarchives.info

Latvian Hockey League
Latvian Hockey League seasons
Latvian